The Bipartisan Background Checks Act is a proposed United States law that would establish new background check requirements for firearm transfers between private parties.  It would prohibit a firearm transfer between private parties until a licensed gun dealer, manufacturer, or importer conducts a successful background check.

Background

Gun violence in the United States 
Gun violence in the United States results in tens of thousands of deaths and injuries annually. In 2018, the most recent year for which data is available as of 2021, the Centers for Disease Control and Prevention's (CDC's) National Center for Health Statistics reported 38,390 deaths by firearm, of which 24,432 were by suicide, and 13,958 were homicides. The rate of firearm deaths per 100,000 people rose from 10.3 per 100,000 in 1999 to 12 per 100,000 in 2017, with 109 people dying per day; the figure was 11.9 per 100,000 in 2018. In 2010, there were 19,392 firearm-related suicides, and 11,078 firearm-related homicides in the U.S. In 2010, 358 murders were reported involving a rifle, while 6,009 were reported involving a handgun; another 1,939 were reported with an unspecified type of firearm.

Provisions

Background Check Requirements 
This bill establishes new background check requirements for firearm transfers between private parties (i.e., individuals who are not federally licensed as gun professionals). Specifically, it prohibits a firearm transfer between private parties unless a licensed gun dealer, manufacturer, or importer first takes possession of the firearm while conducting a background check. The prohibition does not apply to certain firearm transfers, such as a gift between spouses in good faith.

Legislative history 
As of March 12, 2021:

See also 
 Gun law in the United States
 List of bills in the 116th United States Congress
 List of bills in the 117th United States Congress

References

External links 

Proposed legislation of the 116th United States Congress
Proposed legislation of the 117th United States Congress